Stephen John Rayden Patterson (born 4 January 1971) is an Australian politician, and a former Australian rules footballer who played with Collingwood in the Australian Football League (AFL), and Norwood in the South Australian National Football League (SANFL).

He has been a Liberal member of the South Australian House of Assembly since the 2018 state election, representing the Electoral district of Morphett. Patterson has served as the Minister for Trade and Investment in the Second Marshall Ministry between July 2020 and March 2022. He currently serves as the Shadow Minister for Energy and Net Zero, Shadow Minister for Mining and Shadow Minister for Defence and Space Industries in the First Speirs Shadow Ministry.

Early life
Patterson grew up in the Adelaide suburb of Highbury. He attended Pembroke School, Adelaide, and then went on to study a Bachelor of Science (Physics) and Bachelor of Electrical & Electronic Engineering with 1st Class Honours at the University of Adelaide.

Politics
Patterson was elected as a Councillor for the City of Holdfast Bay in November 2010, and went on to become Deputy Mayor during his term. He became Mayor of the City of Holdfast Bay in November 2014, defeating incumbent Ken Rollond.

In April 2017, he defeated the sitting member, Duncan McFetridge, in Liberal Party preselection for the Electoral district of Morphett at the 2018 state election, and was subsequently elected. While he only won 41 percent of the primary vote, McFetridge's preferences flowed overwhelmingly to him, allowing him to easily reclaim the seat for the Liberals.

Patterson has previously served as the Presiding Member of the South Australian House of Assembly Environment, Resources and Development Committee, and the Parliamentary Committee on Occupational Safety, Rehabilitation and Compensation. He has also previously served as a Member of the Economics and Finance Committee, the Public Works Committee, and the Joint Committee on Valuation Policies and Charges on Retirement Villages.

On 29 July 2020, Patterson was appointed as Minister for Trade and Investment, replacing David Ridgway in a cabinet reshuffle.

On 21 April 2022, Patterson was appointed as the Shadow Minister for Energy and Net Zero, Shadow Minister for Mining and Shadow Minister for Defence and Space Industries.

AFL career
Originally from South Australian National Football League (SANFL) club Norwood, Patterson was used mostly as a rover at Collingwood. He also played at half forward or as a wingman on occasions and kicked 25 goals in 1996. Patterson gathered three Brownlow Medal votes from Collingwood's win over North Melbourne in the final home and away match of the 1997 season. The following year, in 'The ANZAC Day clash' against Essendon, Patterson was voted Best on Ground after 24 disposals. His performances in the 1998 season saw him finish the year third in Collingwood's Copeland Trophy voting.

He was the first player to kick a goal against Port Adelaide Power.

Personal life 
Patterson is married and has four children. Patterson is an active member of the Glenelg Surf Life Saving Club, undertaking regular patrols along Adelaide's coastline.

References

Holmesby, Russell and Main, Jim (2007). The Encyclopedia of AFL Footballers. 7th ed. Melbourne: Bas Publishing.
Stephen Patterson from Collingwood Forever

1971 births
Living people
Australian rules footballers from South Australia
Collingwood Football Club players
Norwood Football Club players
Australian sportsperson-politicians
Liberal Party of Australia members of the Parliament of South Australia
Members of the South Australian House of Assembly
21st-century Australian politicians
Mayors of places in South Australia
Deputy mayors of places in Australia